Liberty Hill Schoolhouse in Gainesville, Florida is a one-room schoolhouse built in 1892 to serve African-American children. It replaced a previous Liberty Hill School that was in operation by about 1869, and it operated until 1952. The school served students from the community of Rutledge.

There were no lights in the building and drinking water was brought in.

It was listed on the National Register of Historic Places on August 28, 2003.

See also
List of Registered Historic Black Public Schools in Florida

References

National Register of Historic Places in Gainesville, Florida
School buildings completed in 1892
Vernacular architecture in Florida
Historically segregated African-American schools in Florida
Defunct black public schools in the United States that closed when schools were integrated
1892 establishments in Florida
Buildings and structures in Gainesville, Florida
1952 disestablishments in Florida
Education in Alachua County, Florida